The Penhallow Hotel fire was a suspected arson attack that occurred in Newquay, Cornwall on 18 August 2007. Three people were killed and it was reported as the worst hotel fire in the United Kingdom in nearly 40 years. The hotel was a well-known hotel for holiday makers ranging from families to older residents. It had been built in Island Crescent between 1912 and 1917, and had been altered more than once. The building had a wooden fire escape at the rear, and a central light shaft running from the ground floor up to the roof in the centre of the hotel. Both of these aspects of the building played a dramatic role in the outcome of the fire. Many of those that escaped the fire were elderly holiday makers.

Police at the time concluded that the fire must have been started by an intentional act. 
However the inquest returned open verdicts as the coroner claimed there was insufficient evidence to rule the victims were unlawfully killed.

The remainder of the building was demolished, and the land has since been redeveloped as modern apartments.

Fire
On the night of 18 August 2007, shortly after midnight a power cut was reported followed shortly by the fire alarm activating and soon smoke was seen in the building. It is believed that the fire started in the hotel's drink bar store and then spread throughout the building. A 999 call was made to Cornwall Fire Brigade's fire control at 00:17 and appliances from Newquay were mobilised. Around 4minutes later, when the first crews arrived on scene, it was reported that the building was well alight and further crews were requested.

Some guests woke to the sound of the fire alarm sounding with no immediate signs of smoke or fire. Others reported that the fire alarm could not be heard on the third floor of the hotel, and being hampered in evacuation due to suitcases and obstacles being left in the hallways. Witnesses and guests also spoke of short comings by fire officials as the fire brigade arrived without a ladder long enough to reach the victims on the third floor. A guest spoke of how upon viewing the engine; "I could see no ladder on the fire engine. There was just an engine with a hose."

In 2007, Devon and Cornwall Police stated they would treat the fire, as a "major crime" until they found evidence to the contrary. In January 2008, police announced that the fire was being treated as suspicious, and that the deaths were now therefore potential cases of murder.

Victims 

Over 80 guests and members of staff managed to escape, but three people were killed and five others injured. Initially officials were aware of one fatality with four being unaccounted for, and four others in the hospital. Guest Peter Hughes (a science teacher aged 43 from Staffordshire) died as a result of falling from a second floor window. Hughes' mother Monica (aged 86) also died in the blaze, along with 80-year-old Joan Harper, who was also from Staffordshire.

Investigation
Cornwall Fire and Rescue Service (CFRS) was criticised on how the incident was handled. It was reported that only one fire appliance could be mobilised from Newquay due to a shortage of crew, one appliance was sent and backup was drawn in from surrounding stations, however as previously stated the fire had taken hold by the time of arrival of the first crew. It was found that the shortcoming of appliances did not result in the three deaths. However CFRS upgraded Newquay fire station to 24-hour cover during the summer months when the population rises from an estimated 24,000 to at least 100,000.

At the inquest it was discovered that other factors were seen in the case against the owners of the hotel. Factors for the fire and the poor response were poor fire risk assessment, poor access, lack of water, lack of equipment (high rise ladder) and the FRS (Fire and Rescue Service) being sent to the wrong address.

Legal 
In March 2011, the owners, O & C Holdsworth Ltd, admitted to two charges of fire and health safety breaches in policy. Separately two directors, Nicola Burrito and John McMillan denied three charges against them personally, the charges were eventually dropped by prosecution. The owners of the Cornish hotel that was destroyed in the fire have been fined £80,000 and were ordered to pay £62,000 in penalty costs for failing to meet current fire safety standards. It was not until 2010 that a civil prosecution case began against the owners and several members of the staff by Cornwall Council and Cornwall Fire and Rescue Service for breaches of health and safety laws.

Cornwall Coroner Dr. Emma Carlyon ordered the jury to return open verdicts on all three of the victims, claiming that there was insufficient evidence to rule they were unlawfully killed.

See also

List of building or structure fires

References

Further reading

2007 crimes in the United Kingdom
2007 fires in the United Kingdom
2000s in Cornwall
Arson in England
Unsolved murders in England
2007 disasters in the United Kingdom
August 2007 events in the United Kingdom
Building and structure fires in England
Buildings and structures in Cornwall
Crime in Cornwall
Hotel fires
Newquay